New Downs is a farm near Camborne and St Agnes in Cornwall, England.

History
The location has been known as New Down or New Downs since at least 1768. In 1864, a ploughman on the New Downs, which was a parcel of the inner Goonbrey tenement, turned up a Roman coin picturing the Emperor Valentinian. Other archaeological finds have been made at this site.

See also

 List of farms in Cornwall

References

Farms in Cornwall
Archaeological sites in Cornwall